Ethmia is a large genus of small moths. It is the type genus of the gelechioid family Ethmiidae, which is sometimes included in Elachistidae or Oecophoridae as subfamily.

Selected species
Species of Ethmia include:

Albitogata species-group
Ethmia albitogata (Walsingham, 1907)
Ethmia brevistriga (Clarke, 1950)
Ethmia coquillettella (Busck, 1967)
Ethmia lassenella (Busck, 1908)
Ethmia minuta (Powell, 1973)
Ethmia monachella (Busck, 1910)
Ethmia plagiobothrae (Powell, 1973)
Ethmia scylla (Powell, 1973)
Ethmia tricula (Powell, 1973)
Ethmia umbrimarginella (Busck, 1907)

Amasina species-group
Ethmia amasina (Staudinger, 1879)

Assamensis species-group
Ethmia anatiformis (Kun, 2001)
Ethmia assamensis (Butler, 1879)
Ethmia autoschista (Meyrick, 1932)
Ethmia hunanensis (Liu, 1980)
Ethmia maculata (Sattler, 1967)

Aurifluella species-group
Ethmia aurifluella (Hübner, [1810])
Ethmia lugubris (Staudinger, 1879)
Ethmia maracandica (Rebel, 1901)
Ethmia quadripunctella (Eversmann, 1844)
Ethmia vidua (Staudinger, 1879)

Baliostola species-group
Ethmia baliostola (Walsingham, 1912)
Ethmia cubensis (Busck, 1934)

Bipunctella species-group
Ethmia bipunctella
Ethmia caliginosella (Busck, 1904)
Ethmia cirrhocnemia (Lederer, 1870)
Ethmia euphoria (Kun, 2007)
Ethmia iranella (Zerny, 1940)
Ethmia monticola (Walsingham, 1880)
Ethmia namangana (Rebel, 1901)
Ethmia pagiopa (Meyrick, 1918)
Ethmia treitschkeella (Staudinger, 1879)

Charybdis species-group
Ethmia charybdis (Powell, 1973)

Chrysopyga species-group
Ethmia caradjae (Rebel, 1907)
Ethmia chrysopyga

Confusella species-group
Ethmia berndkerni (Phillips, 2014)
Ethmia billalleni (Phillips, 2014)
Ethmia confusella (Walker, 1863)
Ethmia confusellastra (Powell, 1973)
Ethmia dimauraorum (Phillips, 2014)
Ethmia duckworthi (Powell, 1973)
Ethmia ehakernae (Phillips, 2014)
Ethmia farrella (Powell, 1973)
Ethmia helenmillerae (Phillips, 2014)
Ethmia humilis (Powell, 1973)
Ethmia johnpringlei (Phillips, 2014)
Ethmia julia (Powell, 1973)
Ethmia sandra (Powell, 1973)
Ethmia striatella (Busck, 1913)

Conglobata species-group
Ethmia conglobata (Meyrick, 1912)

Crocosoma species-group
Ethmia crocosoma (Meyrick, 1914)
Ethmia epitrocha (Meyrick, 1914)
Ethmia maculifera (Matsumura, 1931)
Ethmia szabokyi (Kun, 2001)
Ethmia vietmiella (Kun, 2001)
Ethmia yeni (Kun, 2001)

Cyanea species-group
Ethmia cyanea (Walsingham, 1912)

Cypraeella species-group
Ethmia abraxasella (Walker, 1864)
Ethmia blaineorum (Phillips, 2014)
Ethmia cellicoma (Meyrick, 1931)
Ethmia chalcodora (Meyrick, 1912)
Ethmia chalcogramma (Powell, 1973)
Ethmia cupreonivella (Walsingham, 1880)
Ethmia cypraeella (Zeller, 1863)
Ethmia cypraspis (Meyrick, 1930)
Ethmia elutella (Busck, 1914)
Ethmia epilygella (Powell, 1973)
Ethmia festiva (Busck, 1914)
Ethmia fritillella (Powell, 1973)
Ethmia iridella (Powell, 1973)
Ethmia janzeni (Powell, 1973)
Ethmia millerorum (Phillips, 2014)
Ethmia nivosella (Walker, 1864)
Ethmia notomurinella (Powell, 1973)
Ethmia perpulchra (Walsingham, 1912)
Ethmia phylacops (Powell, 1973)
Ethmia proximella (Busck, 1912)
Ethmia scythropa (Walsingham, 1912)
Ethmia submissa (Busck, 1914)
Ethmia terpnota (Walsingham, 1912)
Ethmia ungulatella (Busck, 1914)

Dehiscens species-group
Ethmia dehiscens (Meyrick, 1924)

Distigmatella species-group
Ethmia alba (Amsel, 1949)
Ethmia distigmatella (Erschoff, 1874)
Ethmia falkovitshi (Shovkoon, 2010)
Ethmia quadrinotella (Mann, 1861)
Ethmia tamaridella (Rebel, 1907)
Ethmia turkmeniella (Dubatolov & Ustjuzhanin, 1998)
Ethmia ustyurtensis (Nupponen, 2015)

Ditreta species-group
Ethmia arabica (Amsel, 1961) (mostly included in ditreta)
Ethmia ditreta (Meyrick, 1920)

Dodecea species-group
Ethmia albifrontella (Sattler, 1967)
Ethmia angarensis (Caradja, 1939)
Ethmia candidella (Alphéraky, 1908)
Ethmia dodecea
Ethmia ermineella (Walsingham, 1880)
Ethmia fumidella (Wocke, 1850)
Ethmia japonica (Sattler, 1967)
Ethmia pusiella (Linnaeus, 1758)
Ethmia quadrillella (Goeze, 1783)
Ethmia septempunctata (Christoph, 1882)
Ethmia zygospila (Meyrick, 1934)

Exornata species-group
Ethmia adrianforsythi (Phillips, 2014)
Ethmia dianemillerae (Phillips, 2014)
Ethmia exornata (Zeller, 1877)
Ethmia gelidella (Walker, 1864)
Ethmia mnesicosma (Meyrick, 1924)
Ethmia phylacis (Walsingham, 1912)

Gigantea species-group
Ethmia gigantea (Busck, 1914)

Haemorrhoidella species-group
Ethmia haemorrhoidella (Eversmann, 1844)
Ethmia subsidiaris (Meyrick, 1935)

Hagenella species-group
Ethmia burnsella (Powell, 1973)
Ethmia hagenella (Chambers, 1878)
Ethmia mimihagenella (Powell, 1973)
Ethmia zelleriella (Chambers, 1878)

Hammella species-group
Ethmia hammella (Busck, 1910)

Joviella species-group
Ethmia joviella (Walsingham, 1897)
Ethmia linda (Busck, 1914)

Kirbyi species-group
Ethmia bittenella (Busck, 1910)
Ethmia clarkei (Powell, 1973)
Ethmia davisella (Powell, 1973)
Ethmia delliella (Fernald, 1891)
Ethmia kirbyi (Moeschler, 1890)
Ethmia linsdalei (Powell, 1973)
Ethmia subsimilis (Walsingham, 1897)

Lapidella species-group
Ethmia bisignata (Kun, 2002)
Ethmia didyma (Kun, 2002)
Ethmia heptasema (Turner, 1898)
Ethmia lapidella (Walsingham, 1880)
Ethmia nobilis (Diakonoff, [1968])
Ethmia octanoma (Meyrick, 1914)
Ethmia reposita (Diakonoff, [1968])
Ethmia stojanovitsi (Kun, 2002)

Lineatonotella species-group
Ethmia galactarcha (Meyrick, 1928)
Ethmia lineatonotella (Moore, 1867)
Ethmia palawana (Schultze, 1925)
Ethmia thomaswitti (Kun, 2004)
Ethmia trifida (Kun, 2004)

Longimaculella species-group
Ethmia calumniella (Powell, 1973)
Ethmia catapeltica (Meyrick, 1924)
Ethmia coronata (Walsingham, 1912)
Ethmia flavicaudata (Walsingham, 1912)
Ethmia hendersonorum (Phillips, 2014)
Ethmia hieroglyphica (Powell, 1973)
Ethmia howdeni (Powell, 1973)
Ethmia laphamorum (Phillips, 2014)
Ethmia lesliesaulae (Phillips, 2014)
Ethmia lichyi (Powell, 1973)
Ethmia longimaculella (Chambers, 1872)
Ethmia nicholsonorum (Phillips, 2014)
Ethmia nigritaenia (Powell, 1973)
Ethmia normgershenzi (Phillips, 2014)
Ethmia omega (Powell, 1973)
Ethmia petersterlingi (Phillips, 2014)
Ethmia plaumanni (Powell, 1973)
Ethmia randycurtisi (Phillips, 2014)
Ethmia randyjonesi (Phillips, 2014)
Ethmia subnigritaenia (Powell, 1973)
Ethmia transversella (Busck, 1914)
Ethmia turnerorum (Phillips, 2014)

Lybiella species-group
Ethmia lepidella (Chrétien, 1907)
Ethmia lybiella (Ragonot, 1892)

Macelhosiella species-group
Ethmia geranella (Barnes & Busck, 1920)
Ethmia macelhosiella (Busck, 1907)
Ethmia macneilli (Powell, 1973)
Ethmia timberlakei (Powell, 1973)

Mulleri species-group
Ethmia mulleri (Busck, 1910)

Nigripedella species-group
Ethmia albolinella (Shovkoon, 2010)
Ethmia asbolarcha (Meyrick, 1938)
Ethmia bombina (Sattler, 1967)
Ethmia chrysopygella (Kolenati, 1846)
Ethmia comitella (Caradja, 1927)
Ethmia flavianella (Treitschke, 1832)
Ethmia mongolica (Rebel, 1901)
Ethmia nigrimaculata (Sattler, 1967)
Ethmia nigripedella (Erschoff, 1877)
Ethmia sibirica (Danilevsky, 1975)
Ethmia ubsensis (Zagulajev, 1975)
Ethmia ultima (Sattler, 1967)
Ethmia umbricostella (Caradja, 1927)

Nigroapicella species-group
Ethmia dentata (Diakonoff & Sattler, 1966)
Ethmia nigroapicella (kou leafworm) (Saalmüller, 1880)

Notatella species-group
Ethmia chemsaki (Powell, 1959)
Ethmia hiramella (Busck, 1914)
Ethmia notatella (Walker, 1863)
Ethmia paucella (Walker, 1863)
Ethmia phoenicura (Meyrick, 1932)
Ethmia stephenrumseyi (Phillips, 2014)
Ethmia wellingi (Powell, 1973)
Ethmia zebrata (Powell, 1959)

Papiella species-group
Ethmia papiella (Powell, 1973)
Ethmia volcanella (Powell, 1973)

Piperella species-group
Ethmia piperella (Powell, 1973)

Prattiella species-group
Ethmia prattiella (Busck, 1915)

Punctessa species-group
Ethmia angustalatella (Powell, 1973)
Ethmia punctessa (Powell, 1973)

Pyrausta species-group
Ethmia discrepitella (Rebel, 1901)
Ethmia nykta (Shovkoon, 2010)
Ethmia pyrausta (Pallas, 1771)

Rothschildi species-group
Ethmia pseudoscythrella (Rebel, 1902)
Ethmia rothschildi (Rebel, 1912)

Semilugens species-group
Ethmia albistrigella (Walsingham, 1880)
Ethmia apicipunctella (Chambers, 1875)
Ethmia arctostaphylella (Walsingham, 1880)
Ethmia discostrigella (Chambers, 1877)
Ethmia epileuca (Powell, 1959)
Ethmia mansita (Busck, 1914)
Ethmia nadia (Clarke, 1950)
Ethmia orestella (Powell, 1973)
Ethmia semilugens (Zeller, 1872)
Ethmia semitenebrella (Dyar, 1902)

Suspecta species-group
Ethmia afghana (Sattler, 1967)
Ethmia interposita (Sattler, 1967)
Ethmia similis (Sattler, 1967)
Ethmia suspecta (Sattler, 1967)

Terminella species-group
Ethmia terminella (T.B. Fletcher, 1938)

Trifurcella species-group
Ethmia albicostella (Beutenmüller, 1889)
Ethmia baja (Powell, 1973)
Ethmia clava (Powell, 1973)
Ethmia cordia (Powell, 1973)
Ethmia heptastica (Walsingham, 1912) (misspelled as Ethmia heptasticta)
Ethmia hodgesella (Powell, 1973)
Ethmia marmorea (Walsingham, 1888)
Ethmia miriamschulmanae (Phillips, 2014)
Ethmia mirusella (Chambers, 1874)
Ethmia oterosella (Busck, 1934) (misspelled as Ethmia oterostella)
Ethmia pala (Powell, 1973)
Ethmia penthica (Walsingham, 1912)
Ethmia playa (Powell, 1973)
Ethmia scutula (Powell, 1973)
Ethmia semiombra (Dyar, 1902)
Ethmia similatella (Busck, 1920)
Ethmia sphenisca (Powell, 1973)
Ethmia tilneyorum (Phillips, 2014)
Ethmia trifurcella (Chambers, 1873)

Tripunctella species-group
Ethmia tripunctella (Staudinger, 1879)

Vittalbella species-group
Ethmia lecmima (Sattler, 1967)
Ethmia vittalbella (Christoph, 1877)

Wursteri species-group
Ethmia derbendella (Sattler, 1967)
Ethmia infelix (Wagner, 1914)
Ethmia wursteri (Amsel, 1956)

Unassigned
Ethmia acontias (Meyrick, 1906)
Ethmia albilineata (Viette, 1952)
Ethmia ampanella (Viette, 1976)
Ethmia andranella (Viette, 1976)
Ethmia antennipilosa (Wang and Li, 2004)
Ethmia anthracopis (Meyrick, 1902)
Ethmia antranella (Viette, 1976)
Ethmia apispinata (Wang & Wang, 2012)
Ethmia argomicta (Meyrick, 1920)
Ethmia argopa (Meyrick, 1910)
Ethmia atriflorella (Viette, 1958)
Ethmia austronamibiensis (Mey, 2011)
Ethmia baihua (Yang, 1977)
Ethmia ballistis (Meyrick, 1908)
Ethmia baronella (Viette, 1976)
Ethmia befasiella (Viette, 1958)
Ethmia bicolorella (Guenée, 1879)
Ethmia bradleyi (Viette, 1952)
Ethmia cassiopeia (Meyrick, 1927)
Ethmia circumdatella (Walker, 1863)
Ethmia cirrhosoma (Meyrick, 1920)
Ethmia clytodoxa (Turner, 1917)
Ethmia comoriensis (Viette, 1963)
Ethmia coscineutis (Meyrick, 1912)
Ethmia cribravia (Wang and Li, 2004)
Ethmia cyrenaicella (Amsel, 1955)
Ethmia dactylia (Meyrick, 1912)
Ethmia damaoshanae (Wang & Zheng, 1997)
Ethmia decaryanum (Viette, 1954)
Ethmia deconfiturella (Viette, 1963)
Ethmia decui (Capuse, 1981)
Ethmia defreinai (Ganev, 1984)
Ethmia duplicata (Meyrick 1914)
Ethmia elimatella (Danilevsky, 1975)
Ethmia epiloxa (Meyrick, 1914)
Ethmia epitrocha (Meyrick, 1914)
Ethmia eupostica (Powell, 1985)
Ethmia glabra (Meyrick, 1920)
Ethmia glandifera (Meyrick, 1918)
Ethmia gonimodes (Meyrick, 1925)
Ethmia guangzhouensis (Liu, 1980)
Ethmia hainanensis (Liu, 1980)
Ethmia hakkarica (Koçak, 1986)
Ethmia hamaxastra (Meyrick, 1930)
Ethmia heliomela (Lower, 1923)
Ethmia hemadelpha (Lower, 1903)
Ethmia hemicosma (Meyrick, 1920)
Ethmia hiemalis (Danilevski, 1969)
Ethmia hilarella (Walker, 1863)
Ethmia humiliella (Chrétien, 1916)
Ethmia incertella (Capuse, 1981)
Ethmia iphicrates (Meyrick, 1922)
Ethmia jingdongensis (Wang & Zheng, 1997)
Ethmia judicialis (Meyrick, 1921)
Ethmia kabulica (Amsel, 1969)
Ethmia kutisi (Heppner, 1991)
Ethmia leucocirrha (Meyrick, 1926)
Ethmia linosella (Viette, 1976)
Ethmia livida (Zeller, 1852)
Ethmia mariannae (Karsholt & Kun, 2003)
Ethmia melanocrates (Meyrick, 1923)
Ethmia menyuanensis (Liu, 1980)
Ethmia mixtella (Chrétien, 1915)
Ethmia namella (Mey, 2011)
Ethmia novoryella (Viette, 1976)
Ethmia oberthurella (Viette, 1958)
Ethmia oculigera (Möschler, 1883)
Ethmia oculimarginata (Diakonoff, 1947)
Ethmia ogovensis (Strand, 1913)
Ethmia okinawana (Matsumura, 1931)
Ethmia parabittenella (Capuse, 1981)
Ethmia penesella (Kun & Szaboky, 2000)
Ethmia penyagolosella (Domingo & Baixeras, 2003)
Ethmia pericentrota (Meyrick, 1926)
Ethmia persica (Kun, 2007)
Ethmia phricotypa (Bradley, 1965)
Ethmia pingxiangensis Liu, 1980)
Ethmia postica (Zeller, 1877)
Ethmia powelli (Heppner, 1988)
Ethmia praeclara (Meyrick, 1910)
Ethmia pseudozygospila (Kun & Szaboky, 2000)
Ethmia pseustis (Turner, 1942)
Ethmia pullata (Meyrick, 1910)
Ethmia pylonotella (Viette, 1956)
Ethmia pylorella (Viette, 1956)
Ethmia rhomboidella (Walsingham, 1897)
Ethmia saalmullerella (Viette, 1958)
Ethmia sabiella (Felder & Rogenhofer, 1875)
Ethmia sattleri (Kun, 2007)
Ethmia shensicola (Amsel, 1969)
Ethmia sibonensis (Capuse, 1981)
Ethmia soljanikovi (Danilevsky & Zaguljaev, 1975)
Ethmia sotsaella (Viette, 1976)
Ethmia sphaerosticha (Meyrick, 1887)
Ethmia sporadica (Turner, 1942)
Ethmia spyrathodes (Meyrick, 1922)
Ethmia submersa (Diakonoff, 1966)
Ethmia susa (Kun & Szaboky, 2000)
Ethmia taxiacta (Meyrick, 1920)
Ethmia termenalbata (Capuse, 1981)
Ethmia thoraea (Meyrick, 1910)
Ethmia tyranthes (Meyrick, 1934)
Ethmia unilongistriella (Capuse, 1981)
Ethmia virilisca (Powell, 1985)
Ethmia vulcanica (Kun, 2004)
Ethmia yunnanensis Liu, 1980)
Ethmia zaguljaevi (Kostjuk, 1980)

Former species
 Ethmia andalusica (Staudinger, 1879)

Footnotes

References

  (2008): Australian Faunal Directory – Ethmia. Version of 2008-OCT-09. Retrieved 2010-APR-01.
  (2003): Markku Savela's Lepidoptera and some other life forms – Ethmia. Version of 2003-DEC-29. Retrieved 2010-APR-21.

 
Ethmiinae
Moth genera